Jermaine Leroy Haley (born February 13, 1973) is a former American football defensive tackle in the National Football League for the Miami Dolphins and the Washington Redskins.  He played college football at Butte College.  Prior to attending Butte, Haley went north to play in the Canadian Junior Football League, where he starred for the Surrey Rams and Okanagan Sun.  Haley later played in the CFL for the Toronto Argonauts.

1973 births
Living people
Sportspeople from Fresno, California
American football defensive tackles
American players of Canadian football
Miami Dolphins players
Washington Redskins players
Toronto Argonauts players
Butte Roadrunners football players